Truncation errors in numerical integration are of two kinds:

 local truncation errors – the error caused by one iteration, and
 global truncation errors – the cumulative error caused by many iterations.

Definitions 
Suppose we have a continuous differential equation

 

and we wish to compute an approximation  of the true solution  at discrete time steps .  For simplicity, assume the time steps are equally spaced:

 

Suppose we compute the sequence  with a one-step method of the form

 

The function  is called the increment function, and can be interpreted as an estimate of the slope .

Local truncation error 
The local truncation error  is the error that our increment function, causes during a single iteration, assuming perfect knowledge of the true solution at the previous iteration.

More formally, the local truncation error, at step  is computed from the difference between the left- and the right-hand side of the equation for the increment :

If the increment function  is continuous, then the method is consistent if, and only if, .

Global truncation error 
The global truncation error is the accumulation of the local truncation error over all of the iterations, assuming perfect knowledge of the true solution at the initial time step.

More formally, the global truncation error, at time  is defined by:

 

The numerical method is convergent if global truncation error goes to zero as the step size goes to zero; in other words, the numerical solution converges to the exact solution: .

Relationship between local and global truncation errors 
Sometimes it is possible to calculate an upper bound on the global truncation error, if we already know the local truncation error. This requires our increment function be sufficiently well-behaved.

The global truncation error satisfies the recurrence relation:

This follows immediately from the definitions.

Then the global error satisfies the bound

It follows from the above bound for the global error that if the function  in the differential equation is continuous in the first argument and Lipschitz continuous in the second argument (the condition from the Picard–Lindelöf theorem), and the increment function  is continuous in all arguments and Lipschitz continuous in the second argument, then the global error tends to zero as the step size  approaches zero (in other words, the numerical method converges to the exact solution).

Extension to linear multistep methods 
Now consider a linear multistep method, given by the formula
 
Thus, the next value for the numerical solution is computed according to
 
The next iterate of a linear multistep method depends on the previous s iterates. Thus, in the definition for the local truncation error, it is now assumed that the previous s iterates all correspond to the exact solution:
 
Again, the method is consistent if  and it has order p if . The definition of the global truncation error is also unchanged.

The relation between local and global truncation errors is slightly different from in the simpler setting of one-step methods. For linear multistep methods, an additional concept called zero-stability is needed to explain the relation between local and global truncation errors. Linear multistep methods that satisfy the condition of zero-stability have the same relation between local and global errors as one-step methods. In other words, if a linear multistep method is zero-stable and consistent, then it converges. And if a linear multistep method is zero-stable and has local error , then its global error satisfies .

See also 
 Order of accuracy
 Numerical integration
 Numerical ordinary differential equations
 Truncation error

Notes

References 
 .
 .

External links 
 Notes on truncation errors and Runge-Kutta methods
 Truncation error of Euler's method

Numerical integration (quadrature)